is a railway station on the Echigo Line in Nishi-ku, Niigata, Niigata Prefecture, Japan, operated by East Japan Railway Company (JR East).

Lines
Terao Station is served by the Echigo Line, and is 74.4 kilometers from the starting point of the line at Kashiwazaki Station.

Layout
The station consists of an island platform serving two tracks, with an elevated station building situated above the tracks.

The station has a "Midori no Madoguchi" staffed ticket office. Suica farecard can be used at this station.

Platforms

History 
The station opened on 20 October 1914. With the privatization of Japanese National Railways (JNR) on 1 April 1987, the station came under the control of JR East.

Passenger statistics
In fiscal 2017, the station was used by an average of 2088 passengers daily (boarding passengers only).

Surrounding area
Niigata College of Technology
 Nishi-ku Ward Office

See also
 List of railway stations in Japan

References

External links
 JR East station information 

Railway stations in Niigata (city)
Railway stations in Japan opened in 1914
Stations of East Japan Railway Company
Echigo Line